Drago Ibler (14 August 1894 – 12 September 1964) was a Croatian architect and pedagogue. His style can be described as pure simplicity and functional architecture. 

Ibler was born in Zagreb.  He gained his diploma in architecture at the Technische Hochschule in Dresden, Germany. In 1921, he joined the group around Le Corbusier and L'Esprit Nouveau in Paris. He then studied from 1922 to 1924 at the Staatliche Kunstakademie in Berlin, in the studio of German architect Hans Poelzig which influenced his work during 1920s. 

His first significant project, the District Labour Insurance Building in Zagreb (1923), was the first project to reflect the spirit of the modern architectural movement in Yugoslavia. Between 1925 and 1935, he established the so-called "Zagreb school of architecture" with fellow architects Drago Galić, Mladen Kauzlarić, Stjepan Planić and others.

Drago Ibler was a strong supporter of the social ideals of modern architecture as well as the aesthetics, and founded the Earth Group, with a group of left-oriented progressive artists. He was also a member of CIAM. 

In the 1920s and 1930s, Ibler worked on numerous architectural competitions, but with poor results due to the conservative environment and resistance to his progressive ideas. In this time he designed villas on the island of Korčula and in Zagreb, several industrial buildings, the District Labour Insurance Building in Mostar (built in 1930, today an ambulatory care facility), this building has a convex half-ring-shaped entrance with a porch, and a dynamical balance of the low office building and the tall volume of the residential part and stairways.

After that, he designed the District Labour Insurance Building in Skopje (1932), which was important for Yugoslav architecture because it introduced Le Corbusier's principles, including ribbon windows.

In 1926, Drago Ibler became a professor at the Zagreb Academy of Fine Arts, where he taught architecture until 1941. After that, he relocated to Switzerland and joined the University of Geneva as a lecturer in architecture.

After the World War II, in 1950, he returned to Zagreb, and led a Master Studio in architecture, returning to teaching at the Academy of Fine Arts. He ceased to be a rigid functionalist and encouraged the humanization of architecture by means of more decorative, sculptural and harmonious compositions. An example of this are his designs for the New Opera House in Belgrade (1948; unrealized). He made excellent designs for the New Yugoslav Embassy in Moscow (1959; unrealized), and New Tito's Residence in Zagreb (1961- 4; unrealized). Before his death, he designed several residential blocks in the centre of Zagreb, which are characterized by simplicity and functional planning, in Martićeva, Smičiklasova and Vlaška Streets.

Ibler died, aged 70, in an automobile accident near Novo Mesto, Slovenia.

References

External links
 Ibler, Drago at the Croatian Biographical Lexicon 

1894 births
1964 deaths
Architects from Zagreb
People from the Kingdom of Croatia-Slavonia
Academic staff of the University of Zagreb
Burials at Mirogoj Cemetery
Road incident deaths in Slovenia
Yugoslav architects